Ninos Dankha (born in Baghdad, Iraq) better known by his stage name Prince of Assyria is a Swedish-Iraqi pop rock and folk singer of Assyrian descent.

His family migrated to Sweden when he was one year old and they lived in Linköping, Sweden. He gained fame through his 2009 single "What Ever You Want" on the Kning Disk label followed by his first album, Missing Note, released in 2010, also on Kning Disk that entered the chart in Finland. In his bilingual song "Tliqa", he sang in English and Aramaic. In 2014, he released a second album, Changing Places, on Soliti / Playground.

Discography

Albums

Singles

References

External links
Official website
Facebook

Swedish male singers
Swedish songwriters
Living people
Iraqi emigrants to Sweden
Swedish people of Assyrian/Syriac descent
Year of birth missing (living people)